The Denza D9 is an all-electric and plug-in hybrid minivan produced by Denza, which launched on the Chinese car market in May 2022. The D9 is the first of three new models for 2022. The Denza series will launch five more following products in the future with names starting with the D, E, N, Z, and A letters, spelling the name DENZA.

Overview

The Denza D9 was first launched in the market in August 2022. Four hybrid variants and two full electric trim levels was offered at launch. The hybrid versions has a price ranging from 335,000 RMB to 445,000 RMB (49,300 – 65,600 USD), and the price range of the BEV models go from 390,000 RMB to 460,000 RMB (57,500 – 67,800 USD). An ultra-luxury four-seat variant is also available as a limited production model limited to 99 units and it costs 660,000 RMB (88,400 USD). 

For the interior, the D9 is equipped with seven screens with three in the front including a 10.25-inch instrument panel, a 15.6-inch central control screen, and a heads-up display. For the second row, two screens are on the front seatbacks, and two are in the second-row armrests. There is also a refrigerator between the front seats, accessible by occupants in the second row. Screen mirroring of Android phones is also offered on the TS Link intelligent interactive cockpit. The second-row captain chairs are 10-way adjustable and come with footrests, heating, ventilating, and a 10-point massage function. Three 50kW wireless quick chargers are also onboard.

Specifications
The D9 is based on BYD’s e-platform 3.0 structure as an EV, and the DM-i structure as a hybrid vehicle. The hybrid models have a driving range between 945 and 1040km, with 190km of pure electric range, and offers up to 80kW DC fast charging with a fuel consumption of 6.2-liters per 100km. Power comes from a 1.5-liter turbocharged petrol engine mated with an electric motor in the DM-i EHS170 electric hybrid system and a 3-in-1 rear-drive hybrid assembly. The driving range for the pure electric version is 620km with a maximum charging power of 166kW and a LFP battery with a capacity of 103 kWh.

References

Denza vehicles
Minivans
Production electric cars
Cars introduced in 2022
Cars of China
Hybrid electric cars
Plug-in hybrid vehicles